Rasbora dandia is a species of ray-finned fish in the genus Rasbora from India, Pakistan and Sri Lanka.

References

Rasboras
Fish of India
Freshwater fish of Sri Lanka
Taxa named by Achille Valenciennes
Fish described in 1844